Brandão, in English sometimes Brandao (without the obligatory tilde), is a Portuguese language surname or given name and a place name.

It may refer to:

Places
 Bueno Brandão, Brazil
 Caldas Brandão, Brazil
 Milton Brandão, Brazil
 Paços de Brandão, Portugal
 Porto Brandão, Portugal

People
Antonio Bezerra Brandão, Brazilian footballer
Avelar Brandão Vilela (1912—1986), Brazilian Cardinal of the Roman Catholic Church
Brandão (footballer, born 1941), José Cândido de Campos, Brazilian footballer
Carlos Brandão (born 1958), Brazilian politician
Carlos Miguel Brandão Fernandes (born 1978), Portuguese footballer
Celso Brandão (born 1951), Brazilian photographer
Diego Brandão, Brazilian mixed martial artist 
Evaeverson Lemos da Silva (born 1980), known as "Brandão", Brazilian footballer
Evandro Brandão, a Portuguese footballer
Fernanda Brandão, a Brazilian singer and dancer
Fiama Hasse Pais Brandão, Portuguese poet, dramatist, translator and essayist
Gonçalo Brandão, Portuguese footballer
Ignácio de Loyola Brandão (born 1936), Brazilian writer
José Augusto Brandão, Brazilian footballer
Kimberly Brandão, Portuguese footballer
Leci Brandão (born 1944), Brazilian singer and composer 
Lúcia Maria Brandão Freitas Lobato, short Lúcia Lobato (born 1965), East Timorese politician
Osvaldo Brandão, Brazilian football coach
Pedro Miguel Castro Brandão Costa, Portuguese footballer
Raul Brandão (1867–1930), Portuguese writer, journalist and military officer
Silviano Brandão, Brazilian politician
Idebrando Dalsoto, Brazilian footballer known as Brandão

Portuguese-language surnames
Portuguese masculine given names